Myelopsis is a genus of moths of the family Pyralidae described by Carl Heinrich in 1956. It is sometimes included in the genus Episcythrastis.

Species
Myelopsis alatella (Hulst, 1887)
Myelopsis immundella (Hulst, 1890)
Myelopsis minutularia (Hulst, 1887)
Myelopsis subtetricella (Ragonot, 1889)

References

Phycitini
Pyralidae genera
Taxa named by Carl Heinrich